44 Court Street in Windsor, Connecticut is a well-preserved Italianate brick duplex.  Built in 1876, it is one a few buildings of this type left in the town.  It was listed on the National Register of Historic Places.  It is currently the home of Court Street Financial Services.

Description and history
Court Street is a short one-block predominantly residential street paralleling Broad Street, the main street through the center of Windsor.  Number 44 is on the west side of the street.  It is a two-story structure, four bays wide, with a low-pitch hip roof with deep overhanging eaves.  A two-story ell projects from the north side; a single-story one from the south.  The entrances to the separate units are on the north and south sides, sheltered by small porches with chamfered square posts and Italianate brackets in the eaves. Windows are set in segmented-arch openings, with brick headers and brownstone sills; the entrances are also in segmented-arch openings.

The duplex was built c. 1874 for H. Sidney Hayden, a local developer, as a rental property.  Hayden was responsible for doing a significant amount of residential construction in and around the town center.  He bequeathed the property to his sister when he died.

See also
National Register of Historic Places listings in Windsor, Connecticut

References

Houses in Windsor, Connecticut
Houses on the National Register of Historic Places in Connecticut
Italianate architecture in Connecticut
Houses completed in 1873
National Register of Historic Places in Hartford County, Connecticut